Colleen Mae Ballinger (born November 21, 1986) is an American comedian, YouTuber, actress, singer and writer. She is best known for her Internet character Miranda Sings, posting videos of the character on YouTube, performing her one-woman comedy act on tour in theatres worldwide, and creating and starring in a Netflix original series titled Haters Back Off (2016–2017) about the character. Ballinger created the comically talentless, egotistical and eccentric character to satirize the many YouTube videos featuring people singing badly in hopes of breaking into show business, but who appear unaware of their lack of talent.

Ballinger also features comedy and lifestyle videos on her personal YouTube channel and a vlog channel, Colleen Vlogs. Her YouTube channels, combined, have surpassed 5 billion total views. The Miranda Sings channel has more than 10 million subscribers, and the character has more than 13 million TikTok followers and 6 million Instagram followers. Ballinger won a Teen Choice Award for "Web Star: Comedy" and a Streamy Award as Best Actress. The Hollywood Reporter selected her as one of its Top 25 Digital Stars, and she was ranked No. 5 on Forbes magazine's 2017 list of top entertainment influencers.

Ballinger has appeared as an actress and singer in theatre, television, recordings and web series. She appeared in the web series Escape the Night (2018–2019), played Dawn in the Broadway musical Waitress (2019), guest-starred as Miranda Sings on Comedians in Cars Getting Coffee with Jerry Seinfeld (2014), and has appeared three times on The Tonight Show (2016–2017), among other talk shows. Ballinger has also published two best-selling books, written in Miranda's voice, Selp-Helf (2015) and My Diarrhe (2018). She is married to actor Erik Stocklin.

Early life

Ballinger was born and raised in Santa Barbara, California, the daughter of Tim Ballinger, a sales manager, and his wife Gwen, a homemaker. Ballinger was homeschooled during middle school, attended San Marcos High School and graduated in 2008 from Azusa Pacific University, where she majored in vocal performance. She has two older brothers, Christopher and Trent, and a younger sister, Rachel.

Career

Acting career
From 2007 to 2009, Ballinger performed for Disney in California, gave private voice, movement coaching and piano lessons to children, and performed at parties and cabaret spaces. In 2009, she played Kelsi Nielsen in High School Musical at Candlelight Pavilion Dinner Theatre in Claremont, California. Ballinger appears on the 2010 album More With Every Line, by songwriter Tim Prottey-Jones, and the 2011 album Self Taught, Still Learning by Chris Passey. In New York in 2011, she played Lynda Bird Johnson in a staged reading of First Kids and created the role of Circe in the American Theatre of Actors Off-Broadway production Odyssey – The Epic Musical.

In 2012, Ballinger was featured as nurse Royal in the web series Dr. Fubalous. She also gave a talk at the Boston Children's Theatre about how to use social media to promote yourself as a performer. In 2013, she starred in the episode "Under the Bed" in the web series The Flipside and as Amara in episode 9 of season 2 of the web series Hipsterhood. She plays Meg on the Volume 12 DVD of Family Guy in the live-action version of the show's introduction. Also in 2013, she was featured on the MTV True Life episode "I'm Famous Online". In 2014, she appeared in the episode "Wedding Plans!" on the web series MyMusic.

Ballinger was a guest co-host on The View in 2015. The same year, she was interviewed on the podcast RuPaul: What's the Tee?, starred in a Todrick Hall video, "Beauty and the Beat Boots", and appeared in the Season 2 finale of the Condé Nast Entertainment webseries #HeyUSA, with host Mamrie Hart. Later that year, both as herself and as Miranda Sings, Ballinger starred in a six-episode beauty series parody, called How to Makeup, on the I Love Makeup YouTube channel operated by Collective Digital Studio. In this show, "Colleen has fantastically found a way for guys to become interested in a makeup show ... there's a plot". Re/code featured Ballinger to exemplify "an emerging economy" of internet content providers. She is featured on the track "Clouds" in Flula Borg's 2015 EP, I Want to Touch You.

Ballinger appeared in a series of 2016 DiGiorno pizza commercials. In 2018, she appeared as The Disco Dancer in season 3 of the web series Escape the Night, in a cameo role in the animated film Ralph Breaks the Internet, and in the Ariana Grande music video Thank U, Next. She appeared as The Duchess in season 4 of Escape the Night (2019). She made her Broadway debut in the musical Waitress, as Dawn, where she appeared from August to September 2019. The week of Ballinger's debut, box office grosses for the musical increased by $358,783 to $938,087, and they continued to rise, reaching $963,408 the following week. On Halloween 2020, Ballinger played Janet in a livestream reading of The Rocky Horror Picture Show, starring original cast members Tim Curry, Nell Campbell and Barry Bostwick.

In 2021, Ballinger began voicing the role of Crandy on the Netflix animated series Centaurworld.

Comedy act and online success

In 2009, Ballinger began to make a living by performing her live one-woman comedy act in character as Miranda Sings. She has continued to tour since then and has stated that, of all her professional activities, she gets the most satisfaction in her career from her live performances. In addition to her Miranda tours, Ballinger toured with her then husband, singer and fellow YouTuber Joshua David Evans in music and comedy shows in December 2015 and January 2016 across the US as "The Colleen & Josh Show".

Ballinger displays more than 2,000 videos on her YouTube channels. Her personal channel features comedy, question and answer videos, YouTube challenges, and Ballinger discussing culture and current topics or vlogging her activities with her family, friends and YouTube colleagues. The channel is "highly recommended" by Emertainment Monthly. It has received more than 1.8 billion views and accumulated more than 8 million subscribers. Her Miranda Sings channel has surpassed 2 billion views and 10 million subscribers. A third channel, Colleen Vlogs, with more than 3 million subscribers, chronicles some of her experiences on tour and at home. In 2014, Backstage magazine identified Ballinger as a performer who has "taken great advantage of producing their own content [online] and gathering large fan bases to promote their work." To promote her videos and shows, Ballinger is active on social media, with TikTok followings of more than 13 million for Miranda and 8 million for Ballinger; Instagram followings of more than 6 million for Miranda and 7 million for Ballinger, more than 2 million Twitter followers for Miranda and 1.7 million for Ballinger, and more than 1.6 million page likes on the Miranda Sings Facebook page. BuzzFeed called Miranda "The Queen of Twitter".

Ballinger was able to turn the popularity of her videos into income from a percentage of YouTube advertising fees or occasionally fixed sponsorship fees. Until March 2013, Ballinger's YouTube audience was modest, but in that month, her Miranda Sings channel's audience reached 150,000 subscribers, and both of her YouTube channels began to expand far more rapidly. Ballinger offers merchandise on her mirandasings.com website, and some of the videos contain brand endorsements. For example, a 2016 video, "Sexy Buttery Love Song" promoted Jack in the Box restaurants. In 2016, Forbes magazine ranked Ballinger as the ninth highest-earning YouTuber.

Since 2021, Ballinger and her husband, Erik Stocklin, have streamed weekly podcasts titled Relax! with Colleen and Erik on Apple Podcasts and posted them to a YouTube channel with the same name.

Miranda Sings

YouTube videos

Since January 2008, Ballinger has posted hundreds of videos as her comically talentless and quirky character, Miranda Sings, primarily on the YouTube channel Miranda Sings. The character is a satire of the many YouTube videos featuring bad, but egotistical, performers who film themselves singing as a form of self-promotion, despite receiving the realistic or cruel comments of "haters". "Miranda" is supposedly a home-schooled young woman who still lives with her mother and uncle; she is eccentric and infantilized, narcissistically believes that she was born famous, and is obsessed with show business fame.

In the videos, Miranda sings in a comically off-key, yet plausible, voice and covers mostly pop music hits, rants about internet haters, gives "tutorials" and sometimes discusses the character's backstory or current events, which she usually misunderstands. She uses spoonerisms and malapropisms, is irritable, ludicrously self-absorbed and self-righteous, socially awkward, and has a defiant, arrogant attitude. She responds to viewers who take the videos seriously and offer criticism with the catchphrase, "Haters back off!", telling these critics that "haters make me famous". The character displays unusually active eyebrows and a crooked smile, her head is cocked to one side, and she has pronunciation quirks. She wears bright red lipstick drawn beyond the borders of her lips, dresses in mismatched out-of-style clothing, and often dances stiffly to the music she is performing. Her views of society and morality are politically incorrect, and she displays a strong aversion to anything risque, which she calls "porn". From 2010 to 2012, Ballinger posted Miranda video blogs to a second Miranda YouTube channel, Mirandavlogz.

Ballinger based the character partly on young women that she knew in college. She told The Times of London, "There were a lot of cocky girls who thought they were really talented, and they ... were so rude and snotty.... Then I saw all these girls trying to make a career out of putting videos on YouTube [of themselves singing in their bedrooms] ... clueless to the fact that they were terrible." At first, the "Miranda videos were meant to be an inside joke" among Ballinger's friends. In March 2009, however, a Miranda video called "Free Voice Lesson" quickly became a sensation. The video consists of bad advice about singing technique. Miranda's videos drew predictably sharp criticism on YouTube, and as they became popular, Ballinger modified the character in response to the negative comments. She says: "I took what people hated and exaggerated it more in the next video." The online critics were so harsh that Miranda became a "hero of the anti-bullying movement". Ballinger uses "humour and satire to challenge ideas of popular femininity. ... Miranda Sings ... puts on monstrous makeup to perform parody music videos [rejecting] being conventionally pretty."

After Ballinger became pregnant in 2018, Miranda began a pregnancy storyline in which she claims to be the "virgin Miranda", with a virgin conception. Ballinger mentioned the story arc on a July 2018 appearance on Live with Kelly and Ryan. When Ballinger gave birth, she tweeted about it from Miranda's account as well as her own.

Live comedy act
Since April 2009, Ballinger has performed a one-woman comedy act, as Miranda Sings, at first in cabaret spaces and later in theatres in New York, London, and other cities in the US, UK, Australia, Europe, Canada and elsewhere. BroadwayWorld.com called Miranda "the hottest, freshest and oddest breakout star in the musical theatre/cabaret scene".

In the live comedy acts, Miranda sings pop hits and some musical theatre songs in her signature off-key style. At early performances, she gave "voice lessons" or "acting lessons" to Broadway or West End stars, such as Sutton Foster and Andrew Rannells, to assembled casts of Broadway shows, and to pop stars such as Ariana Grande, in which she was hypercritical of the stars' performances, telling them that they should leave show business. She reads hate mail that she has received; interacts with audience volunteers; uses projected presentations containing terrible spelling and includes a "magic trick" where she sings while appearing to be stabbed through the neck by a sword; the joke is that she sings better when the sword is inserted through her neck.

In her 2014 "Selp Helf" tour, she instructed her (mostly young, female) audience on how to get a boyfriend by being more Miranda-like, "improvising [with volunteers] and creating punchlines on the spot. ... Ballinger, the genius behind Miranda, is so convincing in the role, you ... will likely forget that there is a normal person behind the red lips". One reviewer commented that the show "is no mere ... reproduction of her Internet channel. It is as theatrical as it is musical, comedic as it is inspirational." Another concurred: "Miranda [is] hilarious, and I was struck on several occasions by what an accomplished creation the character is. ... Bridging both personas, the moment she transforms into Miranda, on-stage and mid-song, is an absolute joy – I'd struggle to recall hearing an audience erupt to such an extent, and I couldn't help but join in." Ballinger gave Miranda shows in 57 cities in 2014. Her 2015 tours included a "Miranda 4 Precident"  themed tour and a "Summer Camp" themed tour.  Also in 2015, Miranda was a headliner at the Just for Laughs festival in Toronto, Ontario, Canada, and released a film version of one of her stage shows on Vimeo, titled Miranda Sings: Selp Helf.

Reviewing Ballinger's second engagement as Miranda at the LaughFest festival in Grand Rapids, Michigan, in 2016, a critic noted that the material "resonated with parents as well as the younger set." Among other appearances, she performed as Miranda at the Kennedy Center in April 2016. During the second half of 2016, she toured Miranda shows in the US, England, Ireland, Germany and Denmark, around her Haters Back Off production and promotion schedule. A tour in early 2017, and later performances that year, were billed as "Miranda Sings Live ... Your  Welcome" and involved Miranda celebrating her own funeral. She continued the tour from September 2017 to early 2018 with shows in Europe, Australasia and the US. Her tour in mid-2018 was called Miranda Sings Live ... No Offense. Of Ballinger's last live show of 2018, reviewers for OC Weekly wrote:
With understanding, charisma and just the right amount of self-deprecation, [Ballinger] skillfully sewed together stories of passive aggressive parents and internet trolls, painting a picture of how difficult it is to be yourself in a world of critics – especially when your art is misunderstood. ... With impressive energy, she mixed kid-friendly and adult humor, seesawed between Italian opera and meme-ish internet bangers, and invited an eclectic mix of audience participation on and off stage. ... Her relevant dedication to self-confidence proved a charming theme throughout the show. Truly ahead of her time, she has built a career on empathizing with young people. ... There's something about this specific kind of celebrity that is difficult to understand. It's fresh.

A Netflix comedy special, Miranda Sings Live... Your Welcome, filmed live at the Kennedy Center's Eisenhower Theater in Washington, D.C., was released on June 4, 2019. Sara Aridi of The New York Times wrote: "Her peculiar sense of humor is the kind that simultaneously draws laughs and cringes – and it works." The same month, Ballinger began touring a Miranda show titled "Who Wants My Kid?", which continued throughout 2019 and into early 2020. BroadwayWorld called her 2022 tour her "funniest one yet". She continues to tour in 2023.

Other Miranda appearances and activities
In 2009, Ballinger released a Christmas EP titled Christmas With Miranda Sings. Miranda has been featured in radio, television and internet interviews. Ballinger has also appeared or hosted as Miranda at award shows and given benefit concerts and workshops. Miranda sings two tracks in character on Passey's album Self Taught, Still Learning. In 2012, the character appeared in a comedy film, Varla Jean and the Mushroomheads, and in an episode of the television show Victorious, titled "Tori Goes Platinum", on the Nickelodeon channel. Miranda appeared in the first episode of Dance Chat, an Australian web show, in 2013. She also appeared in a 2014 back-to-school video for Old Navy.

Ballinger guest-starred as Miranda Sings in the season 5 episode, "Happy Thanksgiving Miranda", of Comedians in Cars Getting Coffee with Jerry Seinfeld, in November 2014. Seinfeld called Miranda "a very well-developed character ... just as funny to me as ... to my daughter, who is 13. ... [The episode is] one of the best shows of Comedians in Cars we’ve ever done." Mediaite agreed, writing: "In its fifth season, Jerry Seinfeld's web series continued to be one of the most enjoyable weekly events on the internet. His experience with YouTube star Miranda Sings, which carried its way onto the Tonight Show, was a particular highlight." An Uproxx review compared Ballinger to Andy Kaufman. In December 2014, Ballinger appeared as Miranda on The Tonight Show playing Pictionary with Jimmy Fallon, Martin Short and Jerry Seinfeld. Us Weekly called the segment "the most hilarious game night ever", Entertainment Weekly called it "riveting", and People magazine wrote: "It's the most wonderful trainwrecked game of Pictionary you'll see this holiday season".

In 2015, Ballinger appeared as Miranda on The Grace Helbig Show, together with Jim Parsons, and she released a book, Selp-Helf, published by Simon & Schuster, which calls it a "decidedly unhelpful, candid, hilarious 'how-to' guide". Written in Miranda's voice by Ballinger and her brother Christopher Ballinger, it is presented in mock-scrapbook format, with silly advice, photos and comically bad artwork. The book debuted at No. 1 on the Publishers Weekly Hardcover Non-Fiction best sellers list and The New York Times Best Seller list for Advice, How-To & Miscellaneous. It remained on the Times Best Seller list for Advice & Misc. for 11 weeks and was on their monthly Best Seller list for "Humor" for eleven months. She released a second book, My Diarrhe, in 2018, in the form of a leaked diary. It debuted at No. 8 on The New York Times Best Seller list for Advice, How-To & Miscellaneous. Ballinger appeared on The Late Show with Stephen Colbert in July 2018 to promote the book.

Ballinger appeared as a guest star, as Miranda, speed dating unsuspecting men on the 2016 YouTube Premium series Prank Academy. She conceived, co-wrote, co-produced and starred as Miranda in the Netflix series, Haters Back Off. The series centered around Miranda's odd family life and her road to fame as a YouTuber. Ballinger was featured as Miranda in a cover article in Variety about the show in June 2016. The series ran for two seasons in 2016 and 2017. To promote Haters Back Off, Ballinger appeared on The Tonight Show three times, Chelsea, Live with Kelly and Ryan three times, and Total Request Live. The series was not picked up for a third season.

Ballinger, as Miranda, returned to television in 2022 as a guest star on the game show Generation Gap.

Personal life
Ballinger moved to New York City in 2010 to follow performing opportunities, but she returned to the West coast in 2012 when she realized that, to maximize her YouTube audience, she needed to collaborate with the community of YouTubers based in Los Angeles. In July 2015, after several years of dating, Ballinger and Joshua Evans wed in California. In September 2016, Ballinger and Evans announced in separate YouTube videos that they were divorcing.

Ballinger met actor Erik Stocklin in 2016 when she cast him to play Miranda's love interest, Patrick, in Haters Back Off. The couple began dating by early 2018 and married later the same year. The couple have three children: a boy, Flynn Timothy Stocklin, born on December 10, 2018, and a twin girl and boy, Maisy Joanne and Wesley Koy Stocklin, born on November 6, 2021.

Philanthropy

Since 2015, Ballinger has conducted an annual fundraiser to benefit children with cancer and their families on or around her birthday, November 21. Using her YouTube channel and GoFundMe or similar sites, she has collected donations and sold or given away personal and donated items, Miranda merchandise and props, and draft scripts from Haters Back Off. In 2015, Ballinger donated the funds raised to St. Jude Children’s Research Hospital, while in 2016, she donated to individual families struggling with the costs and burdens of their children's cancer treatments. From 2016 to 2018, she raised over $200,000; her 2019 fundraiser benefitted Children’s Hospital Los Angeles and Family Reach. In 2019, she joined The Game Theorists to raise more than $1.3 million dollars for St. Jude's. In 2020 she raised more than $223,000 from her birthday fundraiser, and in 2021 she raised $263,000.

Reception
Ballinger's YouTube videos have received a total of more than 5 billion views. In 2015, Miranda was ranked the 7th "most popular YouTube personality", by Daily American, and one of the "Top 25 Digital Stars", by The Hollywood Reporter. The Los Angeles Times wrote of her videos, "this footage is a major hoot". Perez Hilton praised Miranda's parody of Sia's song "Chandelier" as "the crowning achievement of music video parodies ... utterly fantastic. ... [Ballinger] really has superb comedic timing." Initially, Miranda Sings enjoyed widespread popularity among musical theatre fans. Later, her fan base expanded particularly among teenagers. TV Guide commented: "Ironically, the character ... was created to satirize the very type of YouTube fame she's managed to cultivate."

The Times of London commented that although Ballinger's videos have gained her character notice, it "is not online but on stage that Miranda truly comes to ghastly life." A reviewer from the Irish Independent wrote: "There is an endearing sweetness to her performance. ... This bizarre and bonkers show is somehow strangely compelling". A 2013 reviewer concurred: "[O]nly a truly talented performer could make the Miranda character believable, let alone as endearing as she ends up being." AussieTheatre.com stated that Ballinger "creates the most successful parody of the world of YouTube ... she has created an international cult following". As the popularity of the character increased, Ballinger was able to book her live Miranda act at larger and larger venues, including the Best Buy Theater in New York City and, among many others, London's Cadogan Hall. Newsweeks review of Miranda's YouTube satire of the 2019 James Charles/Tati Westbrook feud noted that although the character "rarely humanizes herself", she has the surprising ability to "make our heart hurt".

Ballinger's videos as herself have also gained attention: in 2015, her video "Reading Mean Comments" was praised by Cosmopolitan as "hilarious and pretty poignant". In each of 2014, 2015, 2016, 2017 and 2018, Ballinger (or Miranda) was nominated for one or more Teen Choice Awards, winning the award for "Web Star: Comedy" in 2015; she was nominated for three 2015 Streamy Awards, winning for best actress, and was nominated for more Streamys in 2016 and 2018; she was nominated for People's Choice Awards in 2016, 2017 and 2019; and Shorty Awards in 2016, 2017 and 2019. Ballinger was ranked No. 5 on Forbes magazine's 2017 list of top entertainment influencers. She has been ranked No. 1 several times in the weekly Top Comedians Social Media Rankings by The Hollywood Reporter. She has also been noted as a YouTuber who is "a good influence on kids".

In April 2020, a 17-year-old YouTuber accused her of failing to pay him for social media content he had suggested for her Miranda Sings social media accounts (he did not allege any contract between them) and of sending him an inappropriate gift of lingerie that had been modeled over clothing. Ballinger also received criticism when some of her older videos resurfaced satirizing latina and overweight women. In May 2020, Ballinger apologized on YouTube for having posted the older videos, agreeing that they were insensitive and that it had been a mistake in judgment to send the gift to the fan. She noted that she often uses comedy ideas suggested by fans but admitted that it had been a mistake to allow the young fan to post directly to her Twitter account for a day without carefully vetting the content that he posted.

Filmography

Film

Television and web series

Awards and nominations

References

External links

 
 Ballinger on IMDB
 "My Family" pastiche of "Talk Dirty" about the Ballinger family (2014)
 Colleen and Miranda cover of "Belle" (Little Town) from "Beauty and the Beast" (2014)
 Video showing Ballinger's tour preparation (2014)
 Ballinger sings "Worthy" by Chris Passey (2015)
 Ballinger feature by Vanity Fair (2018)

1986 births
21st-century American actresses
Actresses from Santa Barbara, California
American comedy musicians
Parody musicians
American parodists
Parody novelists
American satirists
American web series actresses
American women comedians
YouTubers from California
Azusa Pacific University alumni
Comedians from California
Comedy YouTubers
Living people
Streamy Award winners
21st-century American comedians
21st-century American women singers
Women satirists
Shorty Award winners